Conavalla at , is the 69th–highest peak in Ireland on the Arderin scale, and the 85th–highest peak on the Vandeleur-Lynam scale.  The summit of Conavalla sits just off the main "central spine" of the Wicklow mountains range in Ireland, as it runs from Kippure in the north, to Lugnaquillia in the south.  Conavalla's large massif to the north-east is described as a "wet and boggy barren plain" whose various shoulders dominate the head of the Glendalough valley, and the upper east-side of the Glenmalure valley.

Naming
Irish academic Paul Tempan notes that the "pass" element of Conavalla's name likely refers to the various routes from the Blessington lakes area (e.g. the R756 road to the Wicklow Gap) in the west that crossed parts of Conavalla's boggy massif to get into the Glenmalure valley in the east (note that the Wicklow Gap can be used to access the neighboring Glendalough valley without having to cross Conavalla's massif).

Geography
Convalla is situated in the southern section of the Wicklow Mountains range, and forms a horseshoe on a "boggy" massif, at the head of the Glenmalure valley, with its neighbours, Table Mountain , and Camenabologue . 

Conavalla also sits in another broad horseshoe around the Glendalough valley, with the hydroelectric station at Turlough Hill , and the mountains of Camaderry , Lugduff , and Mullacor .  Conavalla's large "boggy massif" dominates the head of the Glendalough valley stretching from its summit at the far-west side of the head of the valley, to Lough Firrib  on the east-side.  The massif also includes Three Lakes  to the north of the summit of Conavalla.

Conavalla's prominence of  does not qualify it as a Marilyn, but it does rank it as the 39th-highest mountain in Ireland on the MountainViews Online Database, 100 Highest Irish Mountains, where the minimum prominence threshold is 100 metres.

Art O'Neill
On Conavalla's northern slopes lies Art's Cross and Art's Plaque, dedicated to Art O'Neill, the brother of Hugh O'Neill, Earl of Tyrone, who died of exposure in January 1592 helping Hugh Roe O'Donnell to escape from Dublin Castle to the stronghold of Fiach McHugh O'Byrne in the valley of Glenmalure.

Bibliography

Gallery

See also

Wicklow Way
Wicklow Mountains
Lists of mountains in Ireland
List of mountains of the British Isles by height
List of Hewitt mountains in England, Wales and Ireland

References

External links
MountainViews: The Irish Mountain Website, Conavalla
MountainViews: Irish Online Mountain Database
The Database of British and Irish Hills , the largest database of British Isles mountains ("DoBIH")
Hill Bagging UK & Ireland, the searchable interface for the DoBIH

Mountains and hills of County Wicklow
Hewitts of Ireland
Mountains under 1000 metres